Frederick Stephen Upton (born April 23, 1953) is an American politician who served as a U.S. representative from Michigan from 1987 to 2023, representing the state's 6th congressional district since 1993. He is a member of the Republican Party. His district, numbered as the 4th district from 1987 to 1993, is based in Kalamazoo and stretches along the Michigan-Indiana border in the southwestern part of the state. 

A former chairman of the Committee on Energy and Commerce, Upton has played a major role in shaping post-Obamacare health care legislation. He is the only person in American history to vote to impeach two presidents; he voted for the impeachment of Bill Clinton in 1998 and the second impeachment of Donald Trump in 2021, as one of ten Republicans who voted to impeach Trump. After Sander Levin retired at the end of the 115th Congress, Upton became the dean of Michigan's congressional delegation.

Redrawn into the 4th district, Upton did not seek reelection in 2022, and retired from Congress upon his 18th term's expiration in 2023.

Early life, education, and early political career
Upton was born in St. Joseph, Michigan, the son of Elizabeth B. (née Vial) and Stephen Edward Upton (1924–2022). He attended Shattuck-Saint Mary's, graduating in 1971. He earned a B.A. in journalism from the University of Michigan in 1975. He was a member of the Alpha Delta Phi fraternity, Peninsular Chapter, and became a sports editor at The Michigan Daily and thought he might someday cover the Chicago Cubs. He served on the congressional staff of U.S. Representative David Stockman from 1976 to 1980. He was in the Office of Management and Budget (OMB) under Ronald Reagan from 1981 to 1985, while Stockman served as OMB Director.

U.S. House of Representatives

Elections

1986
Upton ran in Michigan's 4th congressional district against incumbent Mark Siljander, Stockman's successor. Upton won the Republican primary 55%–45% and the general election with 62% of the vote.

1988
Upton won reelection to a second term with 71% of the vote.

1990
Upton defeated Ed Fredricks in the Republican primary, 63%–37%. In the general election, he was reelected to a third term with 58% of the vote.

2000

After redistricting, Upton decided to run in the newly redrawn Michigan's 6th congressional district, winning reelection to a fourth term with 62% of the vote.

2002

After redistricting, Upton faced a primary challenge from State Senator Dale Shugars. Upton defeated Shugars 66%–32%. He won the general election with 69% of the vote.

2004

Upton defeated Democratic nominee Scott Elliott, an art gallery owner, 65%–32%.

2006

Upton defeated Democratic nominee Kim Clark, 61%–38%.

2008

Upton defeated Democratic nominee Don Cooney, a Kalamazoo City Commissioner, 59%–39%.

2010

Upton defeated former State Representative Jack Hoogendyk in the Republican primary, 57%–43%. In the general election, he defeated Cooney, 62%–34%.

2012

In 2011, Hoogendyk met with the Club for Growth, a conservative 501(c)4 organization, about running against Upton again. Upton had been criticized for not being conservative enough by Rush Limbaugh, Glenn Beck, FreedomWorks, Right to Life of Michigan, and the Southwest Michigan Tea Party Patriots. On January 17, 2012, Hoogendyk announced that he would challenge Upton in the primary, the winner of which would face the Democratic nominee, former marine and businessman Mike O'Brien.

Initial polls showed Upton with a sizable lead over O'Brien, but an October poll showed Upton and O'Brien in a dead heat heading into the final stretch of the campaign.

2014

Upton won with 55.9% of the vote, defeating Democrat Paul Clements, Libertarian Erwin Haas, and Green Party candidate John Lawrence.

2016

Upton was reelected, defeating Democratic nominee Paul Clements, a political science professor at Western Michigan University, 58.5%–36.4%.

2018

Upton was reelected with 50.2% of the vote against Democratic nominee Matt Longjohn (45.75%) and U.S. Taxpayers Party candidate Stephen Young (4.1%).

2020

Upton was reelected with 55.9% of the vote against Democratic nominee Jon Hoadley (40.2%), Libertarian Party nominee Jeff Depoy (2.75%), and Green Party candidate John Lawrence (1.2%).

Tenure
Upton has been a member of moderate Republican factions The Tuesday Group and the Republican Main Street Partnership. On February 4, 2021, he joined 10 other Republican House members voting with all voting Democrats to strip Marjorie Taylor Greene of her House Education and Labor Committee and House Budget Committee assignments in response to controversial political statements she had made.

Health care
Upton voted against passage of the Affordable Care Act (ACA) and has since voted in favor of its complete repeal. In November 2013, in response to Americans losing their health insurance coverage because of the ACA, Upton proposed a bill that would allow them to retain it. The essence of his bill was to allow insurance companies to maintain their individual insurance market policies according to state insurance rules that were in effect as of 2013. In 2017, Upton played an important role advancing Republican Party efforts to repeal the ACA.

In 2013, Upton introduced a bill that would grant the Food and Drug Administration more power to regulate drug compounding in the wake of the New England Compounding Center meningitis outbreak. In 2016, Obama signed the 21st Century Cures Act into law, a bill Upton co-sponsored. The act establishes funds for biomedical research and to develop and implement a strategic plan for biomedical research. In 2018, Upton and Representative Debbie Dingell worked together on legislation designed to combat opioid addiction. Among other things, it would allocate funding for research into new, non-addictive pain relievers.

Environment and energy

In 2007 Upton co-sponsored the Energy Independence and Security Act of 2007, which, among other things, mandated phased-in energy efficiency standards for most light bulbs. At the time, he noted that the legislation, ultimately signed into law by President George W. Bush, would "help preserve energy resources and reduce harmful emissions, all while saving American families billions of dollars on their electric bills." Glenn Beck called Upton "all socialist" for supporting the bill.

In April 2009, Upton said that "climate change is a serious problem that necessitates serious solutions. Everything must be on the table." But "Upton has gradually retreated from his moderate stance on climate change and carbon emissions." He led a failed effort to stop the Obama administration from enforcing the new energy standards.

Upton's website once stated: "I strongly believe that everything must be on the table as we seek to reduce carbon emissions." In late 2010, he co-authored a Wall Street Journal opinion piece saying he was "not convinced" that "carbon is a problem in need of regulation" and urging Congress to overturn Massachusetts v. Environmental Protection Agency.

Upton and Ed Whitfield co-sponsored H.R. 910, the Energy Tax Prevention Act of 2011.  Due to his environmental policies, The Los Angeles Times wrote in 2011 that Upton "represents one of the biggest threats to planet Earth on planet Earth."

In 2012, Upton, as chair of the House Energy and Commerce Committee, said that Congress's refusal to set greenhouse gas limits "constituted a decision and that lawmakers should act now to reverse the EPA emissions rules." Carbon regulation, he said, "threatens to drive energy prices higher, destroy jobs and hamstring our economic recovery."

On October 22, 2013, Upton introduced the North American Energy Infrastructure Act (H.R. 3301; 113th Congress), a bill that would make changes to permitting requirements for pipelines and other energy infrastructure at international borders. He said the bill "is a sincere effort to focus a targeted solution to lessons learned from the Keystone Pipeline... No one can rightly argue that the current presidential permit process as the State Department is not broken, no matter what side of the climate debate you're on." Upton added, "we're creating a fair and transparent approval process for cross-border energy projects, putting them all on a level playing field for the benefit of North American energy security, lower energy prices, and jobs."

As of 2017, Upton has received more than $2 million in campaign donations from oil and gas companies and electric utilities over the course of his political career. In 2018, he joined the Climate Solutions Caucus.

Technology and infrastructure
Upton introduced legislation to reverse the FCC's ruling on net neutrality in 2015. On November 5, 2021, Upton was one of 13 House Republicans to break with their party and vote with a majority of Democrats in favor of the Infrastructure Investment and Jobs Act.

Guns
In 2019, Upton supported a bill that requires background checks for private firearm sales. He has called for Congress to pass a bipartisan red flag law.

In March 2021, Upton was one of eight Republicans to join the House majority in passing the Bipartisan Background Checks Act of 2021.

LGBT rights
In 2004 and 2006, Upton voted for a constitutional amendment banning same-sex marriage. In 2019, he voted against the Equality Act, which would extend existing civil rights legislation to protect LGBT individuals from discrimination.

In 2013, Upton condemned controversial anti-gay remarks by Republican National Committeeman David Agema.

In 2021, Upton was one of 29 Republicans to vote to reauthorize the Violence Against Women Act. This bill expanded legal protections for transgender people, and contained provisions allowing transgender women to use women's shelters and serve time in prisons matching their gender identity.

In 2021, Upton was one of 33 Republicans to vote for the LGBTQ Business Equal Credit Enforcement and Investment Act.

In 2021, Upton co-sponsored the Fairness for All Act, the Republican alternative to the Equality Act. The bill would prohibit discrimination on the basis of sex, sexual orientation, and gender identity, and protect the free exercise of religion.

On July 19, 2022, Upton and 46 other Republican Representatives voted for the Respect for Marriage Act, which would codify the right to same-sex marriage in federal law.

Economy

In 2019, during the 116th Congress, Upton broke with his party, one of seven Republicans to side with Democrats by voting for legislation that would fund government services and end a shutdown.

In February 2021, Upton voted against a $1.9 trillion COVID relief bill that provided $10 billion in federal aid to Michigan.

Donald Trump
During Trump's presidency, Upton voted in line with Trump's stated position 78.6% of the time.

In July 2019, Upton was one of four Republican House members to vote in support of a motion to condemn comments Trump made on Twitter calling on four Democratic Congresswomen, three of whom were born in the U.S., to "go back and help fix the totally broken and crime infested places from which they came."

On December 18, 2019, Upton voted against both articles of impeachment against Trump.

On January 12, 2021, Upton announced he would vote to impeach Trump in the pending vote on a second impeachment, claiming Trump incited the January 6 United States Capitol attack, becoming the fourth House Republican to say they would vote to impeach. He ultimately did so alongside nine other Republicans on January 13. On January 21, 2021, the Allegan County Republican Party censured Upton for his vote to impeach Trump. He was later censured by the Cass County Republican Party for voting to remove Marjorie Taylor Greene from the House Education Committee.

On May 19, 2021, Upton was one of 35 Republicans who joined all Democrats in voting to approve legislation to establish the January 6 commission meant to investigate the Capitol attack. Before the vote, he was one of few Republican lawmakers to openly express support for the commission.

Iraq
In June 2021, Upton was one of 49 House Republicans to vote to repeal the AUMF against Iraq.

Steve Bannon
On October 21, 2021, Upton was one of nine House Republicans who voted to hold Steve Bannon in contempt of Congress.

Immigration
Upton supports DACA.

Upton voted for the Further Consolidated Appropriations Act of 2020 which authorizes DHS to nearly double the available H-2B visas for the remainder of FY 2020.

Upton voted for the Consolidated Appropriations Act (H.R. 1158), which effectively prohibits ICE from cooperating with Health and Human Services to detain or remove illegal alien sponsors of unaccompanied alien children (UACs).

Abortion
Upton was one of three Republicans to vote for H.R. 8297: Ensuring Access to Abortion Act of 2022.

Upton voted for H.R. 8373: The Right to Contraception Act. This bill was designed to protect access to contraceptives and health care providers' ability to provide contraceptives and information related to contraception. The bill would also fund Planned Parenthood.

Big Tech
In 2022, Upton was one of 39 Republicans to vote for the Merger Filing Fee Modernization Act of 2022, an antitrust package that would crack down on corporations for anti-competitive behavior.

Committee assignments 
 Committee on Energy and Commerce

Caucus memberships 
 Congressional Automotive Caucus (Co-Vice Chair)
 Congressional Competitiveness Caucus
 Congressional Travel and Tourism Caucus
 Diabetes Caucus
 India Caucus
 Indian-Americans Caucus
United States Congressional International Conservation Caucus
 Sportsmen's Caucus
 Bipartisan Climate Solutions Caucus
 House Baltic Caucus
Congressional Arts Caucus
Republican Governance Group
Problem Solvers Caucus
Republican Main Street Partnership

Personal life
Upton's grandfather and eponym, Frederick Upton, was co-founder with his brother Louis Upton of appliance manufacturer and marketer Whirlpool Corporation, headquartered in Benton Harbor. He and his wife have two children. Upton's niece is supermodel Kate Upton. Open Secrets reported that Upton had a net worth of $78 million in 2018, making him one of Congress's richest members.

Upton is a supporter of Michigan Wolverines athletics, as well as an enthusiastic Chicago Cubs baseball fan. He is a member of the Emil Verban Society.

Electoral history

|+ : Results 1986–1990
! Year
!
! Republican
! Votes
! %
!
! Democratic
! Votes
! %
!
! Third Party
! Party
! Votes
! %
!
|-
|1986
||
| |Fred Upton
| |70,331
| |62%
|
| |Dan Roche
| |41,624
| |37%
|
| |Richard Gillmor
| |Independent
| |1,649
| |1%
|
|-
|1988
||
| |Fred Upton
| |132,270
| |71%
|
| |Norman Rivers
| |54,428
| |29%
|
|
|
|
|
|
|-
|1990
||
| |Fred Upton
| |75,850
| |58%
|
| |JoAnne McFarland
| |55,449
| |42%
|
|
|
|
|
|

|+ : Results 1992–2020
! Year
!
! Republican
! Votes
! %
!
! Democratic
! Votes
! %
!
! Third Party
! Party
! Votes
! %
!
! Third Party
! Party
! Votes
! %
!
! Third Party
! Party
! Votes
! %
!
|-
|1992
||
| |Fred Upton
| |144,083
| |62%
|
| |Andy Davis
| |89,020
| |38%
|
|
|
|
|
|
|
|
|
|
|
|
|
|
|
|
|-
|1994
||
| |Fred Upton
| |121,932
| |73%
|
| |David Taylor
| |42,348
| |26%
|
|! style="background:#00bfff; "|E. A. Berker
|! style="background:#00bfff; "|Natural Law
|! style="background:#00bfff; "|1,667
|! style="background:#00bfff; "|1%
|
|
|
|
|
|
|
|
|
|
|
|-
|1996
||
| |Fred Upton
| |146,170
| |68%
|
| |Clarence Annen
| |66,243
| |31%
|
| |Scott Beavers
| |Libertarian
| |3,370
| |2%
|
|
|
|
|
|
|
|
|
|
|
|-
|1998
||
| |Fred Upton
| |113,292
| |70%
|
| |Clarence Annen
| |45,358
| |28%
|
| |Glenn Whitt
| |Libertarian
| |1,833
| |1%
|
|! style="background:#00bfff; "|Ken Asmus
|! style="background:#00bfff; "|Natural Law
|! style="background:#00bfff; "|1,091
|! style="background:#00bfff; "|1%
|
|
|
|
|
|
|-
|2000
||
| |Fred Upton
| |159,373
| |68%
|
| |James Bupp
| |68,532
| |29%
|
| |William Bradley
| |Libertarian
| |3,573
| |2%
|
| |Richard Overton
| |Reform
| |1,872
| |1%
|
| |C. Dennis James
| |USTPM
| |1,290
| |1%
|
|-
|2002
||
| |Fred Upton
| |126,936
| |69%
|
| |Gary Giguere
| |53,793
| |29%
|
| |Richard Overton
| |Reform
| |2,788
| |2%
|
|
|
|
|
|
|
|
|
|
|
|-
|2004
||
| |Fred Upton
| |197,425
| |65%
|
| |Scott Elliott
| |97,978
| |32%
|
| |Randall MacPhee
| |Green
| |2,311
| |1%
|
| |Erwin Haas
| |Libertarian
| |2,275
| |1%
|
| |W. Dennis FitzSimons
| |USTPM
| |2,169
| |1%
|
|-
|2006
||
| |Fred Upton
| |142,125
| |61%
|
| |Kim Clark
| |88,978
| |38%
|
| |Kenneth Howe
| |Libertarian
| |3,480
| |1%
|
|
|
|
|
|
|
|
|
|
|
|-
|2008
||
| |Fred Upton
| |188,157
| |59%
|
| |Don Cooney
| |123,257
| |39%
|
| |Greg Merle
| |Libertarian
| |4,720
| |1%
|
| |Edward Pinkney
| |Green
| |3,512
| |1%
|
|
|
|
|
|
|-
|2010
||
| |Fred Upton
| |123,142
| |62%
|
| |Don Cooney
| |66,729
| |34%
|
| |Melvin Valkner
| |USTPM
| |3,672
| |2%
|
| |Fred Strand
| |Libertarian
| |3,369
| |2%
|
| |Pat Foster
| |Green
| |1,784
| |1%
|
|-
|2012
||
| |Fred Upton
| |174,955
| |55%
|
| |Mike O'Brien
| |136,563
| |43%
|
| |Christie Gelineau
| |Libertarian
| |6,366
| |2%
|
| |Jason Gatties
| |USTPM
| |2,591
| |1%
|
|
|
|
|
|
|-
|2014
||
| |Fred Upton
| |116,801
| |56%
|
| |Paul Clements
| |84,391
| |40%
|
| |Erwin Haas
| |Libertarian
| |5,530
| |3%
|
| |John Lawrence
| |Green
| |2,254
| |1%
|
|
|
|
|
|
|-
|2016
||
| |Fred Upton
| |193,246
| |58%
|
| |Paul Clements
| |119,975	
| |36%
|
| |Lorence Wenke
| |Libertarian
| |16,249
| |5%
|
|
|
|
|
|
|
|
|
|
|
|-
|2018
||
| |Fred Upton
| |147,436
| |50%
|
| |Matt Longjohn
| |134,082
| |46%
|
| |Stephen J. Young 
| |USTPM
| |11,920
| |4%
|
|
|
|
|
|
|
|
|
|
|
|-
|2020
||
| |Fred Upton
| |211,496
| |56%
|
| |Jon Hoadley
| |152,085
| |40%
|
| |Jeff Depoy
| |Libertarian
| |10,399
| |3%
|
| |John Lawrence
| |Green
| |4,440
| |1%
|
|
|
|
|
|

See also

References

Further reading

External links
 
 
 

|-

|-

|-

|-

|-

1953 births
20th-century American politicians
21st-century American politicians
American Congregationalists
Living people
People from St. Joseph, Michigan
Republican Party members of the United States House of Representatives from Michigan
The Michigan Daily alumni
University of Michigan College of Literature, Science, and the Arts alumni
Fred